James Dean (1931–1955) was an American actor and racing driver.

James, Jimmy, or Jim Dean may also refer to:

People

In music
 James Dean Bradfield (born 1969), Welsh singer-songwriter
 James Dean (songwriter) (1943–2006), American songwriter
 Jimmy Dean (1928–2010), American country music singer, entertainer and businessman

In sports
 Jimmy Dean, English football manager
 James Dean (cricketer, born 1842) (1842–1869), English cricketer
 Jimmy Dean (baseball) (1925–2000), American baseball player
 James Dean (cricketer, born 1955) (born 1955), English cricketer
 James Dean (footballer) (1985–2021), English footballer
 Jemmy Dean (James Dean, 1816–1881), English cricketer

Other people
 James Dean, American artist and creator of Pete the Cat
 James Dean, first director of the NASA Art Program
 James Dean (judge), first African American judge elected in Florida after Reconstruction
 James R. Dean (1862–1936), Nebraska Supreme Court Justice
 James Theodore Dean (1865–1939), United States Army officer
 James W. Dean Jr., American academic administrator
 Jim Dean (activist), chairman of Democracy for America

Film
 James Dean (1976 film), a 1976 NBC television film starring Stephen McHattie as Dean
 James Dean (2001 film), a 2001 biographical television film starring James Franco as Dean

Songs
 "James Dean" (song), by the Eagles, 1974
 "James Dean (I Wanna Know)", by Daniel Bedingfield, 2002
 "Jimmy Dean" (song), by Troll, 1989
 "James Dean", by Bleeker, 2018
 "James Dean", by Bonnie Tyler from Silhouette in Red, 1993
 "James Dean", by Goo Goo Dolls from Jed, 1989
 "James Dean", by Kevin McHale, 2019
 "James Dean", by Selma Bajrami, 2012
 "James Dean", by That Handsome Devil from That Handsome Devil, 2006
 "James Dean", by Ufo361 from Ich bin 3 Berliner, 2017
 "James Dean", by The Wrecks from Panic Vertigo, 2018

Other uses
 Jimmy Dean, unseen character in the play and film Come Back to the Five and Dime, Jimmy Dean, Jimmy Dean and Come Back to the Five and Dime, Jimmy Dean, Jimmy Dean
 Jimmy Dean (brand), an American sausage brand owned by Tyson Foods

See also
 James Deane (disambiguation)
 James Deen (born 1986), American pornographic film actor
 Jamie Deen (born 1967), American chef

Dean, James